Isaac Ezban (born 15 April 1986) is a Mexican film director, writer and producer. He is best known for his work on the films The Incident, The Similars, and Parallel.

Life and career
Isaac was born and raised in Mexico City, in a Jewish family. He studied Communication with a major in film at the Universidad Iberoamericana, Drama in London at The Method Studio, and Filmmaking in New York at the New York Film Academy. He wrote 4 short novels before working in the film industry.

Isaac's debut feature film The Incident, starring Raúl Méndez, Nailea Norvind, Hernan Mendoza, Humberto Busto and Fernando Alvarez Rebeil, premiered at Cannes Film Festival in the Blood Window Midnight Galas. It also won Best Original Screenplay at the GIFF, the Mexico Primero Award at Los Cabos International Film Festival, and other 16 awards, and was praised by Guillermo del Toro. His second feature film The Similars, starting Gustavo Sánchez Parra, premiered at Fantastic Fest and Sitges. It also won the award of Best Latin American Film in Sitges and the press award in Morbido.

In 2016, Isaac was hired by Bron Studios to direct his third feature film and first English spoken film Parallel, starring Aml Ameen, Martin Wallström, Georgia King, Mark O'Brien, Alyssa Diaz and Kathleen Quinlan. He is also slated to direct the upcoming feature film based on the Dan Simmons novel, Summer Of Night by Sony Pictures. Isaac is represented by Paradigm Talent Agency and Good Fear Management.

Filmography

References

External links 

1986 births
Living people
Mexican film producers
Film directors from Mexico City
Mexican Jews